Kari Olavi "Kapa" Härkönen (born 9 April 1979), better known by his stage name Brädi, is a Finnish hip hop artist. Brädi (pronounced "Braddy") has sung in Finnish language and in English (the latter mostly under the name Brad Spitt), in bands and solo.

Career
Beginnings
He started his musical career under the name A'damite in 2001. He eventually joined the Finnish hip hop band 5th Element and had three albums with the band.

He was also part of a hip hop trio Herrasmiesliiga with Cheek and TS. He also opened many times for Cheek gigs as "tuplaamassa" (double mass) shows. He also collaborated with Cheek in the music videos "Huligaani", "Raplaulajan vapaapäivä", "Täältä sinne", "Liekeissä", "Jos mä oisin sä", "Viihdyttäjä" and "Maanteiden kingi".

Furthermore, he has also appeared in recordings by Näkökulma, Maajoukkue, A04 and MGI.

Solo career
Brädi's first solo studio album was Repullinen hiittiä released in May 2010. The album was produced by MGI. He also issued a mixtape Repullinen remixejä in 2012. He is preparing a new album after signing with Rähinä Records in 2012. His single "Lämpöö" featuring Redrama reached the Top 10 in Finland.

Personal life
Brädi started as a sportsman playing basketball and is an announcer for the Finnish Namika Lahti basketball club's home games.

Discography

Albums
in 5th Element
2002: I
2004: Kakkonen
2005: 2,8‰
in Herrasmiesliiga
(with Cheek and TS) 
2006: Herrasmiesliiga

Solo

Mixtapes

Singles

Featured in

Music videos
2010: "Mä tarjoon" 
2010: "Kato mun käteen"

References

External links
 Brädi page on Rähinä Records website
Brädi page on Facebook

Finnish hip hop musicians
1979 births
Living people